Charkh ( lit. "Wheel") is an Iranian television talk show that has aired on IRIB TV4 since 2015. Each episode focuses on scientific topics and is approximately 75 minutes in length. The series airs every working day-night (six days a week).

Theme 
The show is aired live and nationwide every evening during the weekdays according to the Iranian calendar on Channel 4. Shariar Rabbani and Milad Nouri perform as presenters and the program in each episode hosts guest(s) from the Iranian scientific community in one of the following fields:

Technology and engineering
Medical science
Fundamental science
Cognitive sciences, philosophy, and history of science
Environment and natural resources

The program is an interactive discussion between the host and the guest rather than a monologue stream and the discussion may be enriched with presentations, slide shows, movie clips, or graphics related to the subject. In Charkh it has been aimed to present an attractive science-based discussion using a live program with a language compatible with the appetite of Iranian youth.

References

External links
 
Official site of the show
episodes on Aparat.com
Milad Nouri talks about copyright
Milad Nouri talks about machine learning

Islamic Republic of Iran Broadcasting
Iranian television series
Islamic Republic of Iran Broadcasting original programming